Victoria Jamieson is an American author and illustrator of children's books, known for her graphic novels.

Her most decorated books is When Stars Are Scattered, co-authored with Omar Mohamed and published in 2019. It is a semi-autobiographical account of Mohamed's time with his brother as Somali refugees at a camp in Kenya. It was shortlisted for the 2020 National Book Award for Young People's Literature and was a 2022 Bank Street Children's Book Committee's Best Book of the Year with an "outstanding merit" distinction and winner of the Committee's Josette Frank Award for fiction.

Other notable books include Roller Girl (2015), a graphic novel about middle school and roller derby, which was a 2016 Newbery Honor winner and named a 2016 Bank Street Children's Book Committee's Best Book of the Year. Another middle school graphic novel, All's Faire in Middle School (2017), was named to the 2018 Bank Street Children's Best Books of the Year List with an “Outstanding Merit.”

Bibliography
 Olympig! (2012)
 Pest in Show (2013)
 Roller Girl (2015)
 Pets on the Loose! The Great Pet Escape (2016)
 Pets on the Loose! The Great Art Caper (2017)
 All's Faire in Middle School (2017)
 When Stars Are Scattered,  co-authored with Omar Mohamed (2020)

References

External links
Official website

American women children's writers
American women illustrators
American children's writers
American children's book illustrators
Living people
Year of birth missing (living people)
21st-century American women